Athey Manithan is a 2000 Tamil language horror film directed by K. Rajeshwar. The film stars Livingston, Maheswari and Lakshmi. It was released on 28 April 2000.

Plot

Mandhira Moorthy (Livingston), a medical representative, will soon marry Bhavani (Maheswari) who is from a rich family. Mandhira Moorthy is deeply in love with Bhagavathi (Lakshmi), a poor dancer, and she becomes pregnant. His miser aunt pressured Mandhira Moorthy for money so he decides to leave the village for the city.

Later, Bhagavathi comes to see Mandhira Moorthy after a while. Shocked to see her before his marriage, Mandhira Moorthy brings her to a remote place. He marries her in front of a statue of God and he then kills the harmless Bhagavathi. Mandhira Moorthy feels guilt for his deed.

After getting to Bhavani, Mandhira Moorthy suspects Bhavani of being haunted by Bhagavathi.

Cast

Soundtrack

The film score and the soundtrack were composed by Adithyan. The soundtrack, released in 2000, features 6 tracks with lyrics written by Piraisoodan.

References

2000 films
2000s Tamil-language films
Indian horror films
Films directed by K. Rajeshwar
2000 horror films